Buck Creek School is a historic school in Perry, Kansas.

It was built in about 1878 and added to the National Register in 1988.

It is a  plan building with limestone blocks forming its west, south, and east walls, and limestone rubble forming its north wall.

References

Defunct schools in Kansas
School buildings on the National Register of Historic Places in Kansas
Italianate architecture in Kansas
School buildings completed in 1878
Buildings and structures in Jefferson County, Kansas
National Register of Historic Places in Jefferson County, Kansas
1878 establishments in Kansas